Trinity College Chapel is the chapel of Trinity College, Cambridge, a constituent college of the University of Cambridge. Part of a complex of Grade I listed buildings at Trinity, it dates from the mid 16th century. It is an Anglican church in the Anglo-Catholic tradition.

Building and architecture

The chapel was begun in 1554–55 by order of Queen Mary and was completed in 1567 by her half-sister, Elizabeth I. The architectural style is Tudor-Gothic, with Perpendicular tracery and pinnacles. The roof is of an earlier style than the rest of the building, and may have been re-used from the chapel of King’s Hall, the college which preceded Trinity on this site. Only the walls and roof are of Tudor date, but the walls were re-faced in ashlar in the 19th-century and present slate roof-covering is modern. The whole chapel was restored by Edward Blore in 1832 and further work took place between 1868–1873 when Arthur Blomfield added the vestry, Choir-room and porch, and the Chapel re-roofed, painted and glazed.

Windows
The original white-glass windows with religious inscriptions were replaced as part of the redecoration of the chapel that took place between 1871 and 1875. The cost of the redecoration works was £20,000 (equivalent to £ million in ) of which £11,000 (equivalent to £ million in ) was raised by subscriptions. This late Victorian pictorial stained glass was designed by Pre-Raphaelite artist Henry Holiday to a scheme devised by Trinity theologians, B.F. Westcott and F.J.A. Hort. They comprise eight windows on the north side and seven on the south side of the quire, each depicting eight figures representing features or movements of the related period, in roughly historical sequence and arranged in an upper and lower row of four. The cost of the windows was supported by donors who were Trinity alumni themselves or given in dedication to the memory of alumni.

The table below contains details of each window, with latin inscription and related article link.

Memorials
There are many memorials to former fellows of Trinity within the chapel, some statues, some brasses, including two memorials to graduates and fellows who died during both World Wars.  There are also several graves dating from earlier periods.

Organ
The chapel has a fine organ, originally built by "Father" Smith in 1694. Many alterations were made over the years until, in 1913, an almost totally new organ was built. Some of the pipes were so large that they would not fit in the organ loft and instead had to stand in a corner of the ante-chapel. In 1976 the present mechanical-action instrument, based on the surviving pipework and within the original cases, was completed by the Swiss firm Metzler Söhne. There are regular recitals on Sundays during term time.

Choir
The Choir of Trinity College, Cambridge is composed of around thirty male and female Choral Scholars and two Organ Scholars, all of whom are undergraduates of the College. Besides singing the liturgy in the chapel, the choir has an extensive programme of performances and recordings. The current Director of Music is Stephen Layton.

Burial ground
The Ascension Parish Burial Ground contains the graves or interred cremations of twenty-seven fellows of Trinity College, including three Vice-Masters.

List of deans of Chapel
The Dean of Chapel holds responsibility for the Chapel and the Clergy at Trinity.

1873–1877: Handley Moule
 ? – ?  Frederick Arthur Simpson
1923–1943: Hugh Fraser Stewart
1943–1958: John Burnaby
1958-1969: Harry Williams
1969–1983: John Robinson 
1984–1991: John Bowker 
1991–2006: Arnold Browne 
2006–present: Michael Banner

List of memorials/graves

Notes

References

Bibliography

External links
 Trinity College Chapel
 

Chapels of Colleges of the University of Cambridge
Grade I listed churches in Cambridgeshire
Chapel